Keells is a chain of supermarkets in Sri Lanka owned by John Keells Holdings. It is one of the three largest retail operators on the island, alongside Cargills Food City and Arpico Super Center.

References

John Keells Holdings
Supermarkets of Sri Lanka